Brent Pirow (born 6 February 1959) is a South African former professional tennis player.

Pirow twice qualified for the singles main draw of a grand slam tournament. At the 1982 Wimbledon Championships, which he made as a lucky loser, he lost in the first round to third seed Vitas Gerulaitis. His other appearance came at the 1983 French Open, where after winning his way through qualifying he won his first round match against Gilles Moretton, in five sets. He was beaten in the second round by Patrice Kuchna in another five setter.

Challenger titles

Singles: (1)

References

External links
 
 

1959 births
Living people
South African male tennis players
Place of birth missing (living people)